The 1998 season of Úrvalsdeild was the 87th season of league football in Iceland. ÍBV defended their title. ÍR and Þróttur were relegated. The competition was known as Landssímadeild, due to its sponsorship by the now-defunct company, Landssíminn.

League standings

Results
Each team played every opponent once home and away for a total of 18 matches.

Top goalscorers

References

Úrvalsdeild karla (football) seasons
Iceland
Iceland
1998 in Icelandic football